In the Name Of is a 2013 Polish drama film directed by Małgorzata Szumowska. The film won the Teddy Award for Best Feature Film on LGBT topics at the 63rd Berlin International Film Festival and was screened at the Frameline Film Festival at the Castro Theater in San Francisco on 25 June 2013. The film focuses on a closeted gay Catholic priest living in rural Poland.

Plot
Father Adam (Andrzej Chyra) takes over a new parish and organizes a center for socially maladjusted youth. He quickly convinces people with energy, charisma and openness. Friendship with a local outsider (played by Mateusz Kościukiewicz) will force the priest to face his own problems, from which he once escaped into the clergy.

Cast
 Andrzej Chyra as Priest Adam
 Mateusz Kosciukiewicz as "Dynia" Lukasz
 Maria Maj as Dynia's mother
 Maja Ostaszewska as Ewa
 Tomasz Schuchardt as "Blondi"
 Łukasz Simlat as  Ewa's husband

References

External links
 

2013 drama films
2013 LGBT-related films
2013 films
Films about LGBT and Christianity
Films critical of the Catholic Church
Polish drama films
2010s Polish-language films
Polish LGBT-related films
Gay-related films
Films directed by Małgorzata Szumowska
LGBT-related drama films